Segar LRT station is an elevated Light Rail Transit (LRT) station on the Bukit Panjang LRT line in Bukit Panjang, Singapore, located near the junction of Bukit Panjang Ring Road and Segar Road.

Etymology

The station is located near Segar Road. Segar means "fresh" in Malay.

Incidents
Due to a sudden electric surge on one of the fuse boxes, a fire broke out on 9 March 2015 in the electrical room of Segar LRT Station. The fuse box could not withstand the sudden surge and burst into flames, resulting a power trip and a 24-hour service suspension.

References

External links

Railway stations in Singapore opened in 1999
Bukit Panjang
LRT stations of Bukit Panjang LRT Line
Light Rail Transit (Singapore) stations